The 1968 Missouri gubernatorial election was held on November 5, 1968, and resulted in a victory for the Democratic nominee, incumbent Governor Warren E. Hearnes, over the Republican candidate, St. Louis County Executive Lawrence K. Roos.

Results

References

Gubernatorial
1968
Missouri
November 1968 events in the United States